Kaarlo Johan Jalmari "Kalle" Anttila (30 August 1887 – 10 October 1949) was a Finnish wrestler. He won Olympic gold medals in the freestyle lightweight category in 1920 and in the Greco-Roman featherweight division in 1924. He also won world titles in the Greco-Roman featherweight in 1921 and 1922. Anttila was the Finnish champion in Greco-Roman wrestling in 1918–20 and 1929 and in freestyle wrestling in 1924 and 1929. He was born and raised in Finland In 1887, immigrated to Canada at the age of 4 where he was raised to work hard on a family farm. He died in 1954 and was buried in Sudbury.

References

1887 births
1975 deaths
People from Muhos
Finnish male sport wrestlers
Olympic wrestlers of Finland
Wrestlers at the 1920 Summer Olympics
Wrestlers at the 1924 Summer Olympics
Olympic gold medalists for Finland
Olympic medalists in wrestling
Medalists at the 1920 Summer Olympics
Medalists at the 1924 Summer Olympics
World Wrestling Championships medalists
Sportspeople from North Ostrobothnia
19th-century Finnish people
20th-century Finnish people